Kelsale Windmill may refer to a number of windmills in Kelsale, Suffolk.

Skoulding's Mill, a tower mill at 
Steam Post Mill at Skoulding's, a post mill at 
Harvey's Mill, a post mill at 
Carlton Mill, a post mill at approximately

Sources

Windmills in Suffolk